Aleksa Batak (born 18 January 2000) is a Serbian volleyball player. Since the 2019/2020 season, he is playing in the Italian Serie A, in the team Consar Ravenna.

References

External links
 Porto Robur Costa profile
 LegaVolley profile
 Volleybox profile
 CEV profile
 Volleyball World profile
 OSSRB-Web.Data Project profile

2000 births
Living people
Serbian men's volleyball players
Expatriate volleyball players in Italy
Serbian expatriate sportspeople in Italy